On April 15, 2014, Matthew de Grood, son of Calgary Police Inspector Doug de Grood, stabbed five young adults to death at a house party in the Brentwood neighbourhood of Calgary, Alberta, Canada. The party was several blocks away from the University of Calgary campus, and held to mark the end of its school year. It was Calgary's deadliest massacre.

Stabbing
The attack occurred at 1:20 a.m. at a house at 11 Butler Crescent, where about thirty people were present at a party. The assailant, an invited guest, committed the attacks shortly after arriving at the party. He obtained a large knife at the house and stabbed the victims methodically. Each victim was stabbed multiple times. The suspected attacker fled on foot but was arrested by police 40 minutes later with the aid of the K-9 unit.

Victims
The victims were Joshua Hunter, Kaitlin Perras, Jordan Segura, Lawrence Hong, and Zackariah Rathwell. They ranged from 21 to 27 years of age. Hunter lived in Priddis, Alberta, and the other four lived in Calgary. Hong, Segura, and Rathwell were pronounced dead at the scene, while Perras and Hunter died in the hospital.

Perpetrator
Matthew de Grood, aged 22, was identified as the suspect. He attended the University of Calgary and was planning on attending law school. Prior to the stabbings, he was an employee of Safeway. He is the son of a city police officer with the rank of Inspector. He was held at a secure psychiatric facility adjacent to the Calgary Remand Centre. According to authorities, de Grood personally knew at least one person that was present during the party. According to his parents and classmates, his behaviour had started to change in the weeks before the stabbings; he began posting more frequently on Facebook, submitting "bizarre" status updates. Hours before the killings, he posted the title of the Megadeth song "Dread and the Fugitive Mind" to his Facebook page. Prior to the stabbing, he sent text messages to his parents, claiming he was going to harm himself. He was found with garlic in his pocket at the time of arrest, which stems from his online posts of him killing vampires.

De Grood was charged with five counts of first-degree murder and was ordered to stand trial on May 29, 2015. He had no previous run-ins with the police. On May 22, he was found mentally fit to stand trial after undergoing a psychiatric assessment. On May 29, 2015, his trial was set to begin on May 16, 2016, with jury selection set to begin four days earlier.

On May 25, 2016, de Grood was found not criminally responsible for the homicides on the basis of a mental disorder (schizophrenia, per two of three expert witnesses) that caused a psychotic episode during the killings. According to his lawyer, Allan Fay, he intentionally killed the five victims, but believed they were werewolves and vampires who threatened his life. The NCR order means de Grood will be locked down in a psychiatric facility, and receive periodic reviews that could lead to his release under certain conditions.

Matthew de Grood told the Alberta Review Board he wishes the "terrible tragedy" had never happened.

In September 2019, Matthew de Grood was granted unsupervised outings by the Alberta Review Board, although they say that he "remains a significant risk to the safety of the public."

University response
Although the stabbings occurred off-campus, the close relationship between the parties involved and the University of Calgary elicited a direct response from the school's community. University president M. Elizabeth Cannon described the event as a "senseless tragedy" in which the community "lost a part of its family."

On April 15, 2015, the university held the UCalgaryStrong Festival, meant both to celebrate the end of the school year and to commemorate the one-year anniversary of the stabbing. The festival was part of the broader UCalgaryStrong initiative, which aims to "reduce loneliness and isolation, and foster resiliency in the face of the stressors that are part of the post-secondary experience." Victim Lawrence Hong was also granted a posthumous degree in 2015, and memorial scholarships have been established for him and two other victims, Joshua Hunter, and Jordan Segura, in their respective disciplines. Zackariah Rathwell was granted a posthumous degree in 2015 from the Alberta College of Art and Design.

See also
Claresholm highway massacre
Edmonton shooting

References

2014 crimes in Canada
2014 in Alberta
April 2014 crimes in North America
Mass murder in 2014
April 2014 events in Canada
Crime in Alberta
Deaths by stabbing in Canada
2014 Calgary stabbing
Mass stabbings in Canada
Murder trials
Stabbing attacks in 2014
Knife attacks
Mass murder in Alberta